Frank McAllister (April 29, 1918 – May 5, 1987), nicknamed "Chip", was an American Negro league pitcher in the 1930s and 1940s.

A native of Forrest City, Arkansas, McAllister made his Negro leagues debut in 1937 with the Pittsburgh Crawfords. The following season, he joined the Indianapolis ABCs, and was selected to play in the East–West All-Star Game. McAllister died in Cairo, Illinois in 1987 at age 69.

References

External links
 and Seamheads
 Frank McAllister at Negro League Baseball Players Association
 Frank McAllister at Arkansas Baseball Encyclopedia

1918 births
1987 deaths
Harrisburg Stars players
Indianapolis ABCs (1938) players
St. Louis–New Orleans Stars players
New York Black Yankees players
Pittsburgh Crawfords players
St. Louis Stars (1939) players
20th-century African-American sportspeople
Baseball pitchers